Delhi–Amritsar High Speed Rail Corridor is a planned high-speed rail line connecting India's capital, New Delhi and Punjab's city Amritsar. It was one of the six new high-speed rail corridors planned in 2019.

The high-speed route connecting important cities of Northern India will cut short the distance from existing six hours to under two.

Stations
Stations are planned and may be may subject to change.
The Sangrur–Chandigarh extension will connect the union territory, Chandigarh with Amritsar and Delhi.

Amritsar–Jammu

According to the National Rail Plan (NRP) unveiled by the ministry of railways, the Delhi–Amritsar line would be extended until Jammu via Pathankot, in order to provide economic boost to Jammu as well as to improve tourism connectivity for Vaishno Devi.

See also
High-speed rail in India
Delhi–Ahmedabad high-speed rail corridor
Delhi–Varanasi high-speed rail corridor

References

External links
 Preliminary Study 

High-speed railway lines in India
Standard gauge railways in India
Rail transport in Haryana
Proposed railway lines in India
Rail transport in Delhi
India–Japan relations
2020 in rail transport
Transport in Delhi
Transport in Amritsar